Amazone zu Pferde ("Amazon on horseback") is an outdoor 1895 bronze equestrian statue by Prussian sculptor Louis Tuaillon, installed in Tiergarten in Berlin, Germany. The name of the artwork refers to the Amazon warriors, a nation of "all women" warriors of Iranian origin (related to Scythians and Sarmatians), who inhabited the regions around the Black Sea and Eurasian steppes from the 2nd millennium BC, until the start of the Early Middle Ages.

See also

 1895 in art

References

External links
 

1895 establishments in Germany
1895 sculptures
Amazons in art
Bronze sculptures in Germany
Equestrian statues in Germany
Mitte
Outdoor sculptures in Berlin
Sculptures of women in Germany
Statues in Germany
Tiergarten (park)